

The Ahırkapı Feneri, a historical lighthouse still in use, is located at the southern Seraglio Point on the Rumelian coast of Bosporus' south entrance, in Ahırkapı neighborhood of Istanbul's Fatih district, Turkey. A line connecting the two lighthouses marks the southern boundary of the Port of Istanbul.

History
It is told that a marine accident, which occurred near this location, led to the establishment of the lighthouse. In 1755, a merchant sail ship bound for Egypt ran aground off the shore of Kumkapı due to bad weather conditions in the night. Hearing of the ship grounding, Ottoman sultan Osman III (reigned 1754–1757) rushed to the scene, where a seaman complained about the lack of a lighthouse there that could provide safe navigation around the hazardous waters. On the sultan's order, a light fueled by olive oil was established by the Kapudan Pasha atop a watchtower of the city's walls at this location.

Ahırkapı Lighthouse

In 1857, Sultan Abdülmecid I (reigned 1839–1861) commissioned the building of a lighthouse, which was constructed by French engineers in Ahırkapı (literally ) right outside of the city walls south of the Topkapı Palace.

The masonry lighthouse has a conical shape and is painted white with one narrow black horizontal band. To the  tower, a keeper's house is  attached.

Initially, the lighthouse was lit by kerosene, however the light source was later replaced by Dalén light using carbide (acetylene gas). Finally, it was  electrified. The lighthouse's lantern has a 500mm catadioptric cylindrical lens and a 1,000 W lamp.

Ahırkapı Feneri is listed in Turkey under the code "TUR-056" and its radio call sign is TC1ALH. It is operated and maintained by the Coastal Safety Authority of the Ministry of Transport and Communication.

Transport
The lighthouse is in walking distance from the Cankurtaran railway station, now dismissed, which was served by the İstanbul-Halkalı Line before the construction of Marmaray.

See also

 List of lighthouses in Turkey

References

External links

 Directorate General of Coastal Safety 

Lighthouses completed in 1857
Bosphorus
Sea of Marmara
Fatih
Lighthouses in Istanbul
1857 establishments in the Ottoman Empire